Guilty Melody is a 1936 British drama film directed by Richard Pottier and starring Don Alcaide, Gitta Alpar and John Loder. It was based on a short story by Hans José Rehfisch. In the film, a British spy falls in love with a singer whose husband is working for the enemy. It was made at Ealing Studios by the independent company Franco London Films. The film's sets were designed by art director Holmes Paul.

A separate French-language version Disk 413 was also made.

Cast
 Don Alcaide as Duke of Mantua 
 Gitta Alpar as Marguerite Salvini 
 Arty Ash as Inspector Bartle 
 Nils Asther as Galloni 
 Coral Browne as Cecile 
 Clifford Buckton as Police Inspector 
 Robert English as Chief Inspector 
 Ethel Griffies as Lady Rochester 
 John Loder as Richard Carter

References

Bibliography
 Low, Rachael. Filmmaking in 1930s Britain. George Allen & Unwin, 1985.
 Wood, Linda. British Films, 1927-1939. British Film Institute, 1986.

External links

1936 films
British spy drama films
1936 drama films
1930s spy drama films
1930s English-language films
Films directed by Richard Pottier
Ealing Studios films
Films based on short fiction
British multilingual films
British black-and-white films
1936 multilingual films
1930s British films